Alesi is a surname. Notable people with the surname include:

Andrija Aleši, Renaissance sculptor and master architect
Giuliano Alesi (born 1999), French racing driver
James Alesi, New York State Senator
Jean Alesi, French racing driver of Italian origins
Octavio Alesi (born 1986), Venezuelan swimmer
Valerio Alesi, former professional soccer player